Toshiyuki Honda (born April 9, 1957, Tokyo) is a Japanese jazz musician and composer.

Honda's father was a jazz critic, whose name was also Toshiyuki Honda. As a jazz musician, he learned flute and saxophone, and worked in the late 1970s with George Otsuka and the Burning Waves ensemble. In the 1980s he worked with Chick Corea, Tatsuya Takahashi, and Kazumi Watanabe, as well as leading his own ensemble, Super Quartet. He was also a member of the ensemble Native Son.

Starting in the late 1980s, Honda turned increasingly toward composing for film and television, as well as working in record producing. He composed the soundtrack for the film A Taxing Woman in 1987, which raised his prominence as a film scorer.

Discography

Studio Albums 
 Burnin Waves (Electric Bird, 1978) 
 Opa Com Deus (Electric Bird, 1979)
 Easy Breathing (Electric Bird, 1980)
 Boomerang as Toshiyuki Honda & Burning Waves (Electric Bird, 1981)
 Spanish Tears as Toshiyuki Honda & Burning Waves (Electric Bird, 1981)
 Toshiyuki Honda (Electric Bird, 1982)
 Shangri-La (Eastworld, 1982)
 September as Toshiyuki Honda & The New Burning Wave (Eastworld, 1983)
 Dream with Chick Corea, Miroslav Vitous, Roy Haynes (Eastworld, 1983)
 Modern (1984)
 The Super Quartet as Toshiyuki Honda featuring The Super Quartet (1986)
 Radio Club (1987)
 Something Coming On as Toshiyuki Honda Radio Club

Soundtrack albums 
A Taxing Woman (1987)
A Taxing Woman's Return (1988)
Gunhed (1989)
A-Ge-Man: Tales of a Golden Geisha (1990)
Minbo (1992)
Supermarket Woman (1996)
Metropolis 
Nasu: Summer in Andalusia (2003)
Rebellion: The Killing Isle (2008)

References

Japanese jazz flautists
Japanese jazz saxophonists
Japanese jazz bandleaders
Japanese jazz composers
Musicians from Tokyo